Podoima is a commune in the Camenca District of Transnistria, Moldova. It is composed of two villages, Podoima and Podoimița (Подоймиця, Подоймица).

References

Communes of Transnistria
Camenca District